Mazor  is a settlement in central Israel.

Mazor may also refer to:
 Mazor Robotics, an Israeli medical device company
 Gaby Mazor (born 1944), Israeli archaeologist
 Mazor Bahaina (born 1973), Israeli rabi and politician
 Moran Mazor (born 1991), Israeli singer
 Stanley Mazor, American engineer

See also 
 Mazur (disambiguation)
 Mazer (disambiguation)
 Mazar (disambiguation)
 Qizil-Mazor district, a former district in Tajikistan